Attachie is a locality in British Columbia, located at the confluence of the Halfway and Peace Rivers.

Name origin
The locality is named for a Chief Attachie of the Dane-zaa (Beaver) people, who was a signee of Treaty 8 and a famous hunter who died in the great influenza epidemic of 1918-1919 and is buried at Halfway River.

References

Settlements in British Columbia
Peace River Country